Franco Squillari (born 22 August 1975) is a former professional male tennis player from Argentina. He won 3 singles titles, reached the semifinals of the 2000 French Open and achieved a career-high singles ranking of World No. 11.

Career
As a junior, Squillari won the 1993 South American Closed Junior Championships (in Paraguay).

Squillari entered the world's top 50 in 1998, and won a total of three ATP Tour singles titles (all in Germany) during his career. He reached the semifinals of the 2000 French Open defeating Alexander Popp, Jiří Vaněk, Karol Kučera, Younes El Aynaoui and future champion Albert Costa, before losing to Magnus Norman. He went on to reach the fourth round of the French Open the following year as well. 

He reached three Masters quarterfinals: Rome in 1999 (where he beat world no. 3 Carlos Moya, Cincinnati in 2000 and Hamburg in 2001. He also beat world no. 3 Yevgeny Kafelnikov in Barcelona in 1999.

He is one of the few tennis players to have a perfect 100% record against Roger Federer, having beaten him both times they played, in 2001 and 2003.

Squillari retired in 2005.

Career finals

Singles (3 wins, 3 losses)

Grand Slam singles performance timeline

External links
 
 
 

1975 births
Living people
Argentine people of Italian descent
Argentine male tennis players
Olympic tennis players of Argentina
Tennis players from Buenos Aires
Tennis players at the 2000 Summer Olympics